The State Opera Stara Zagora (Darzhavna opera Stara Zagora), founded in 1925, is the second opera theatre in Bulgaria, after the National Opera and Ballet in Sofia. It has the first purpose-built opera house building in Bulgaria.

External links
 
 Entase Profile

Opera houses in Bulgaria
Performing groups established in 1925
Stara Zagora
Ballet venues
Ballet companies
Bulgarian opera companies
Buildings and structures in Stara Zagora
Tourist attractions in Stara Zagora
Theatres completed in 1925
Music venues completed in 1925